Chikara (Japanese for "power") is a compilation album by American rock band Kiss, released in 1988 on Polystar.

Background
The album was released on CD only in Japan in support of Kiss' 1988 Japanese tour. It was limited to 100,000 copies and has long been out of print. Early copies included a special sew-on patch of the Chikara symbol. One item of note is that this was the only official compact disc release of the extended 12" single version of the song "I Was Made for Lovin' You", until the 4-track "Psycho Circus" single in 1998.

Track listing

The booklet incorrectly lists the three Creatures of the Night tracks as remixes. These tracks were taken from the 1985 remastering of the album. Only the title track is remixed. The tracks are not unique to this CD.

There is some debate as to the sourcing of the tracks. There is an odd fade-out of "Detroit Rock City" and an early fade-out/cutoff of "All Hell's Breaking Loose" as examples.

Notes

1988 greatest hits albums
Kiss (band) compilation albums